Zalia may refer to:

Zalia, West Virginia
 Manuel Zelaya (born 1952), Honduran businessman & politician

See also
 Zulia (disambiguation)